Andy Roddick was the defending champion, but he lost in the first round against Łukasz Kubot.
Novak Djokovic won in the final 6–2, 7–6(7–4), against Marin Čilić.

Seeds

Draw

Finals

Top half

Bottom half

Qualifying

Seeds

Qualifiers

Draw

First qualifier

Second qualifier

Third qualifier

Fourth qualifier

External links
 Main Draw
 Qualifying draw

China Open - Men's Singles
2009 China Open (tennis)

cs:China Open (tenis) 2009 - muži
pl:China Open 2009 - mężczyźni